Swindlehurst is a surname. Notable people with the surname include:

 Dave Swindlehurst (born 1956), English footballer 
 Lee Swindlehurst (born 1960), American electrical engineer 
 Owen Swindlehurst (1928–1995), British bishop
 Thomas Swindlehurst, British tug of war competitor